5D or 5-D may refer to:

Math, science, and technology
Five-dimensional space
Canon cameras:
Canon EOS 5D
Canon EOS 5D Mark II
Canon EOS 5D Mark III
Canon EOS 5D Mark IV
Konica Minolta Maxxum 5D, Dynax 5D, or DG-5D, a digital camera
Little finger, the fifth digit (abbreviated 5D) of the hand

Arts and media
Yu-Gi-Oh! 5D's, a Japanese anime series
5D, the production code for the 1978 Doctor Who serial The Androids of Tara
"5D", a song by Death Grips on their 2011 mixtape Exmilitary
"5D (Fifth Dimension)", a 1966 song by the Byrds

Other uses
Aeroméxico Connect (IATA code D5)

See also
D5 (disambiguation)
Fifth Dimension (disambiguation)